Çelebi (IPA: /t͡ʃelebi/) is a Turkish title meaning "gentleman", "well-mannered" or "courteous". Çelebi also means “man of God”, as a i-suffixed derivative from çalab (IPA /t͡ʃalab/), which means "God" in old Turkish. German linguist and Turkologist Marcel Erdal, citing Baron Tiesenhausen, traces çalab back to Arabic djellaba "importer, trader, merchant" > "high social positions"; jallāb is derived from root j-l-b "to have brought, to import", ultimately from West Semitic root g-l-b "to catch, to fetch".

Notable people with the title include:

 The sons of Ottoman sultan Bayezid I, who fought one another for the throne in the Ottoman Interregnum of 1402 to 1413:
 İsa Çelebi (1380–1406)
 Musa Çelebi (died 1413)
 Mehmed Çelebi (1390–1421), who won the civil war, being crowned sultan Mehmed I
 Mustafa Çelebi (1393–1422)
 Süleyman Çelebi (1377–1411)
 Ali Çelebi: see Kınalızâde Ali Çelebi
 Aşık Çelebi (1520–1572), Ottoman poet and biographer
 Çelebi, family of descendants of Rumi (13th-century Persian poet and Sufi mystic), who established and led the Sufi Mevlevi Order ("the whirling dervishes") for 800 years 
 Evliya Çelebi (1611–1682), Ottoman traveler
 Gazi Çelebi, 14th-century Turkish pirate and ruler of Sinop
 Hezârfen Ahmed Çelebi, alleged 17th-century Ottoman aviator, brother of Lagâri Hasan Çelebi
 Hoca Çelebi (1490–1574), Ottoman Grand Mufti
 Katip Çelebi (1609–1657), Ḥājjī Khalīfa, Ottoman polymath and encyclopaedist.

 Eremya Çelebi Kömürciyan (1637-1695), Ottoman Armenian traveller.
 Kınalızâde Ali Çelebi (1510/11?–1572), Ottoman jurist and writer.
 Kinalizâde Fehmi Çelebi (1564–1596), Ottoman poet, son of Kınalızâde Ali Çelebi.
 Kınalızâde Hasan Çelebi (1546-1604), Ottoman poet and bibliographer, son of Kınalızâde Ali Çelebi.
 Lagâri Hasan Çelebi, alleged 17th-century Ottoman aviator, brother of Hezârfen Ahmed.
 Nişancı Tâcı-Zâde Câ’fer Çelebi (Nishandji Tadji-zade Dja'fer Çelebi; 1459-1515), 16th-century Ottoman statesman and a diwan poet
 Seydi Ali Reis (1498–1563), or Sidi Ali Ben Hossein, an Ottoman admiral and nautical writer.
 Suzi Çelebi of Prizren (died 1524), Ottoman epic poet.
 Yirmisekiz Mehmed Çelebi (died 1732), Ottoman statesman.

See also
 Çelebi (disambiguation), for post-Ottoman Turks with the surname, and other uses
 Chalabi (surname)
 List of Ottoman titles and appellations
 Cilibi Moise (1812-1870), Jewish Romanian humourist whose nickname derived from Turkish çelebi

References

Ottoman Empire
Turkish titles
Ottoman titles